is a Japanese manga series based on the female idol group AKB48. This series is illustrated by Reiji Miyajima, and based on the original work by Motoazabu Factory. The story is told through the eyes of the 12th generation Kenkyūsei member Minoru Urayama. Real AKB48 members also appear occasionally in the story as supporting characters.

AKB49: Renai Kinshi Jourei was serialized in Kodansha's Weekly Shōnen Magazine from August 2010 to January 2016. It was collected into twenty-nine tankōbon volumes.

In 2014, the first five volumes were adapted into a stage play that ran for a week in September 2014. Various members of the 48 group family made up the cast.

Plot
The story follows Minoru Urayama, a high school boy who has no dreams. Minoru's crush, Hiroko Yoshinaga, dreams of becoming a member of the idol group AKB48.  In order to help her with her auditions, Minoru secretly enters with her, cross-dressed as a girl named Minori Urakawa.  His plan works and Hiroko is picked, but much to his dismay so is his girl alias, Minori!  The story then follows Minori (Minoru) and Hiroko as they overcome the numerous trials of the idol world while Minoru tries to keep his secret from getting exposed and get Hiroko to the very top.

Characters
 / 

The main male character in the story and a 12th generation Kenkyūsei member of the female idol group AKB48. He is also known by his female name "Minori Urakawa" in this story. 167 cm tall, Minoru has a younger sister.

Initially, Minoru had no interest in AKB48, and because of this, was laughed at by his classmates who were big fans of the group. However, in order to help Hiroko, his classmate whom he had a secret crush on, Minoru cross-dressed and participated in an audition together with her. Unwittingly, after he helped Hiroko pass her audition, he was selected by AKB48's producer Yasushi Akimoto to become a member of the group. Almost nobody suspected that he was a male, because he had a face that looked "pretty". He was often mistaken for another AKB48 member Sae Miyazawa by Yuko Oshima. Only member Mayu Watanabe suspected that he was a boy, though she was convinced by his explanation that he looked like one because he worked in a butler café.

Unknown to everyone including Minoru, Producer Akimoto also knew that Minoru/Minori was a male, but because he felt that Minoru made up for the traits that other girls were lacking, Minoru was allowed to remain in the group. On Chapter 93 of the series, Atsuko Maeda also knew that he was a male, but tells Minori/Minoru that she'll never reveal the secret. Minoru unveiled himself and his "Minoru" persona to Aki-P at the ending of Chapter 204, however the rest of the meeting remained unknown. On Chapter 253, Hiroko somehow found out about his/her identity, due to a massive search. He unveiled his/her identity in front of all members of AKB48, Togasaki, and whole stage crew on Chapter 256.

Used to be a member of a newly created stand-alone unit "Gekoku Jou" with Hiroko Yoshinaga and Ai Okabe. Currently a full-time member of Team A and co-current member of SKE, NMB, and HKT as national member alongside Hiroko.

A 12th generation Kenkyūsei member of AKB48. She is a big fan of the idol group, especially one of the lead member Atsuko Maeda. She would get very angry with anyone who criticized Maeda. She passed the 12th generation Kenkyūsei audition because she spoke out in defense of Maeda when Minoru criticized Maeda when he was asked the question "which is your favorite AKB48 member?".

A person who dislikes sports, Hiroko is frequently tired out by the dance trainings that all Kenkyūsei members have to go through, to the extent that she injures herself frequently. However, she is also very hardworking, and she frequently stayed back after the practice sessions to continue dancing with Minoru. As the series progressed, her hard work paid off with her dancing abilities greatly improving.

Used to be a member of the stand-alone unit "Gekoku Jou" with Minoru Urayama and Ai Okabe.
Currently a full-time member of Team K and co-current member of SKE, NMB, and HKT as national member alongside Minori.

In Senbatsu Election on Chapter 212 Hiroko Yoshinaga was elected to number 8 and she will be the center in next single after Senbatsu Election single because the promise between Minoru Urayama and Yasushi Akimoto.

An 11th generation Kenkyūsei member of AKB48. Talented in dancing and singing, she is however also very ambitious and self-centered, which caused her to view "Minori" with enmity after he replaced her as center in Kenkyūsei performances, and even tried to sabotage him inside and outside performances. However, after he constantly emerged unscathed from her plots and even saved her from a botched sabotage attempt, she reluctantly concluded a truce with him. As the series progressed, while remaining aloof from the other Kenkyūsei members, she was forced to admit that Minoru made a better center than her due to his charisma and hard-working attitude.

Used to be a member of the stand-alone unit "Gekoku Jou" with Minoru Urayama and Hiroko Yoshinaga.
she is former a member of Team B. Announced Graduation on Chapter 202.

A 12th generation Kenkyūsei member of AKB48. Hailing from Fukuoka, she stays in a dormitory designated for AKB48 kenkyūsei members and became roommates with Hiroko after the latter was rendered homeless after a confrontation with her father. Revealed to be a former boss of a ladies biker gang back in Fukuoka.

The manager of the stand-alone unit "Gekoku Jou". A tall and handsome person, he is also very clumsy and accident-prone. He is however extremely dedicated to his work and sincerely believed in fostering the unit to its utmost. He is described as "someone who fully understands the pains and regrets of an idol".

A mysterious old man who appears to be a janitor, he is later revealed to be the director of Queen Records, the company that manages "Gekoku Jou".

Real-life characters
 Minami Takahashi (高橋 みなみ)
 AKB48 team A's captain.

 Haruna Kojima (小嶋 陽菜)
 AKB48 team A member.

 Mariko Shinoda (篠田 麻里子)
 AKB48 team A member.

 Atsuko Maeda (前田 敦子)
 AKB48 team A member. In this story, she is portrayed as a very hardworking member who is credited with making the group famous. However, after she appeared unenthusiastic in a series of concerts, people started to criticize her as "lazy", and her popularity starts to drop. She is Hiroko Yoshinaga's favorite idol in the group and is also the reason why she joined it as a Kenkyūsei member.

 Rino Sashihara (指原 莉乃)
 AKB48 team A member.

Rie Kitahara (北原 里英)

 AKB48 team B member.

 Sayaka Akimoto (秋元 才加)
 AKB48 team K's captain.

 Minami Minegishi (峯岸 みなみ)
 AKB48 team K member.

 Tomomi Itano (板野 友美)
 AKB48 team K member.

 Sae Miyazawa (宮澤 佐江)
 AKB48 team K member. She was cast to play the role of Minoru in the 2014 stage adaptation.

 Yūko Ōshima (大島 優子)
 AKB48 team K member. She was first introduced in this manga when Minoru Urayama accidentally stumbled into the AKB48 dressing room and surprised her. When interviewed, Yūko said that "when she read the manga, she felt like she was in that dressing room as illustrated by the author.".

 Yuki Kashiwagi (柏木 由紀)
 AKB48 team B's leader.

 Mayu Watanabe (渡辺 麻友)
 AKB48 team B member.

 Yasushi Akimoto (秋元 康)
 The producer of AKB48. He is also featured in this manga as the producer of this group.

 Tomonobu Togasaki (戸賀崎 智信)
 The manager of the AKB48 Theater.

Media

Manga
AKB49: Renai Kinshi Jourei was first announced by AKB48 producer Yasushi Akimoto on 5 August 2010. It was serialized in Kodansha's Weekly Shōnen Magazine from 25 August 2010, to 20 January 2016. Kodansha released twenty-nine tankōbon volumes from 17 December 2010, to 17 March 2016.

AKB49: Renai Kinshi Jourei is the first manga to be based on the group AKB48, although some of its members have been featured in the manga Den no Uyugi Club and Ugirino.

Volume list

Stage play
The first five volumes of the manga were adapted for a stage play, directed by Kayano Isamu. The play was performed from September 11 to September 16, 2014 in Shibuya AiiA Theater in Tokyo. Various members of AKB48 and its sister groups were cast for the musical, with Sae Miyazawa taking the male lead role of Minoru. Other main cast roles are played by Akari Suda (Ai Okabe), Mako Kojima, and Nana Owada (sharing the role of Hiroko). On January 10, 2015, it was announced that a second edition of the musical would be performed by March in Nagoya, this time focusing on a cast of actors chosen exclusively from sister group SKE48. The main cast roles would be played by Nao Furuhata (as Minoru Urayama), Akane Takayanagi (as Ai Otabe), Ryoha Kitagawa and Ami Miyamae (double cast as Hiroko Yoshinaga).

References

Notes

External links

 

2010 manga
AKB48
Cross-dressing in anime and manga
Japanese idols in anime and manga
Music in anime and manga
Shōnen manga